Kiril Georgiev Barbutov (born 13 June 1967) is a Bulgarian wrestler. He competed in the men's freestyle 130 kg at the 1992 Summer Olympics.

References

External links
 

1967 births
Living people
Bulgarian male sport wrestlers
Olympic wrestlers of Bulgaria
Wrestlers at the 1992 Summer Olympics
People from Petrich
Sportspeople from Blagoevgrad Province
20th-century Bulgarian people
21st-century Bulgarian people